Olaf Sæther (7 January 1872 – 1 November 1945) was a Norwegian rifle shooter who competed in the early 20th century. He won the gold medal with the Norwegian 300 metre free rifle team at the 1908 Summer Olympics in London, and four years later at the 1912 Summer Olympics in Stockholm he won the silver medal with the free rifle team.

References

External links

1872 births
1945 deaths
Norwegian male sport shooters
ISSF rifle shooters
Olympic gold medalists for Norway
Olympic silver medalists for Norway
Olympic shooters of Norway
Shooters at the 1908 Summer Olympics
Shooters at the 1912 Summer Olympics
Olympic medalists in shooting
Medalists at the 1908 Summer Olympics
Medalists at the 1912 Summer Olympics
People from Hedmark
Sportspeople from Innlandet
20th-century Norwegian people